Bethancourt is a surname. Notable people with the surname include:

Brandon Bethancourt, member of electronic band Alaska in Winter
Christian Bethancourt (born 1991), Panamanian baseball player
Joe Bethancourt (1946–2014), American folk musician

Surnames of French origin